JDS Fuyushio (SS-524) was the second . She was commissioned on 17 September 1963.

Construction and career
Fuyushio was laid down at Mitsubishi Heavy Industries Kobe Shipyard on 6 December 1961 and launched on 14 December 1962. She was commissioned on 17 September 1963.

On 1 February 1965, the 1st Submarine was reorganized into the 1st Submarine Group, which was newly formed under the Self-Defense Fleet.

On 23 March 1979, the 1st Submarine was abolished and became a ship under the direct control of the 1st Submarine Group. 

The vessel was removed from the naval register on 10 June 1980.

Citations

External links

1962 ships
Natsushio-class submarines
Ships built by Kawasaki Heavy Industries